Sutor Basket Montegranaro, is an amateur Italian basketball club based in Montegranaro, Marche. It plays in the Promozione (7th division) as of June 2015.

It was formerly in the top division, with the 2013-14 season its last in Lega Basket Serie A before on and off the court issues led to the club leaving the professional world.

History
The basketball club was founded in 1955 by local parish priest Don Gaetano Campanelli from Porto San Giorgio as Società Sportiva Sutor, sutor being a Latin word for shoemaker, the main local source of employment at the time.

Sutor mostly played in the lower divisions in its early years, they were promoted to the second division Legadue in 2001 for the first time in history. Though they were relegated back to Serie B they returned to the Legadue in 2004.

An against the odds promotion to the first division Serie A in 2006 allowed the small town of Montegranaro to become part of the Italian basketball elite.

Logos

Arena
Historically, the team has played at the PalaSavelli (capacity: 3,800) in Porto San Giorgio, with a brief intermede in Ancona at the PalaRossini (capacity:5,066).

Players

Notable players

Sponsorship names
Throughout its history, due to sponsorship, the club has been known as:
Premiata Montegranaro (1998-09)
Sigma Coatings Montegranaro (2009–10)
Fabi Shoes Montegranaro (2010–12)

External links
Official Website 
Profile at Lega Basket 

1955 establishments in Italy
Basketball teams established in 1955
Montegranaro